The 2011 season is Club Social y Deportivo Colo-Colo's 80th season in Primera División Chilena. This article shows player statistics and all official matches that the club have and will play during the 2011 season, from July to December.

The 2011 season will consist of two local tournaments, the Clausura and the local Copa Chile competition.

Campeonato Clausura

Players

Squad 

 

 (captain)

Squad stats

Disciplinary records

Transfers

In

Out

Competitions

Torneo Clausura (regular stage) 

Results summary

Result round by round

Torneo Clausura (play-offs) 
Quarter-finals

Semi-finals

Copa Chile 

Colo-Colo finished in 21st position (of 36 teams) with 8 points, being eliminated from the tournament as they were placed outside the Top 8.

Friendly matches

References

Colo Colo
2011
Colo